Brevig is a village on the island of Barra, in the Outer Hebrides, Scotland. The settlement is situated on the A888, which is Barra's circular main road. Brevig is also within the parish of Barra.

The Druim A' Charra standing stones are situated close to the settlement. The remains of other sites, which were possibly stone circles, are also in the area.

References

External links

Canmore - Barra, Brevig site record

Villages on Barra